The Nuclear Power Plant in Cernavodă is the only nuclear power plant in Romania. It produces around 20% of the country's electricity. It uses CANDU reactor technology from AECL, using heavy water produced at Drobeta-Turnu Severin as its neutron moderator and as its coolant agent. The Danube water is not used for cooling of the active zone (nuclear fuel).

By using nuclear power, Romania is able to reduce its greenhouse gas emissions by over 10 million tonnes each year.

The project began in 1978, and the power plant was designed in Canada by Atomic Energy of Canada Limited in the 1980s, and was contracted during the Communist era. The initial plan was to build four units, and schedule their startup from 1985 onward. A fifth unit was subsequently planned on the direct orders of Communist leader Nicolae Ceaușescu during a visit to the site. The plant's originally planned units 1 to 4 are in a neat line and unit 5 is offset due to the local geology. Units 1 and 2 are currently operational. Three more partially completed CANDU reactors exist on the same site, part of a project discontinued at the fall of the Ceaușescu regime, their work being halted since 1 December 1990.

CNE-INVEST is responsible for the preservation of Units 3–5.

Reactors

Unit 1
Unit 1, a CANDU 6-type, was finished in 1996 and produces 705.6 MW of electricity. Its scheduled startup, however, would have been circa 1985, had it not been for the economic factors at the time.

It was commissioned and began operating at full power in 1996 and has had record capacity factors of 90 percent since 2005.

In 2019 planning was progressing for a modernisation scheme for 30 years of plant life, to be carried out by Korea Hydro & Nuclear Power who have experience of CANDU modernisation at Wolseong. A refurbishment outage is expected from December 2026 and December 2028. Optimization work was decided in 2022 to be done by Candu Energy Inc.

Unit 2
A consortium of AECL and Ansaldo Nucleare of Italy, along with the Nuclearelectrica (SNN) SA, Romania's nuclear public utility, was contracted in 2003 to manage the construction of the partially completed Unit 2 power plant and to commission it into service.

Four years later, Unit 2, another CANDU 6-reactor, achieved criticality on 6 May 2007 and was connected to the national grid on 7 August. It began operating at full capacity on 12 September 2007, also producing 706 MW.

Unit 2 was officially commissioned on Friday, October 5, 2007, during ceremonies attended by Romanian Prime Minister Călin Popescu-Tăriceanu and senior officials from Atomic Energy of Canada Limited (AECL). This makes CNE-Cernavoda Station the third largest power producer in the country.

Future expansion

Units 3 and 4
Units 3 and 4 were expected to be CANDU 6 reactors with a similar design to Unit 2 and will each have a capacity of 720 MW. The project was estimated to take up to six years after the contracts are signed.

A 2006 feasibility study carried out by Deloitte and Touche determined that the most economically viable scenario was to build the two reactors at the same time, with the cost estimated at €2.3 billion.

On 20 November 2008, Nuclearelectrica, ArcelorMittal, ČEZ, GDF Suez, Enel, Iberdrola and RWE agreed to set up a joint company dedicated to the completion, commissioning and operation of Units 3 and 4. The company named Energonuclear was registered in March 2009.

20 January 2011, GDF Suez, Iberdrola and RWE pulled out of the project, following ČEZ which had already left in 2010, citing "Economic and market-related uncertainties surrounding this project, related for the most part to the present financial crisis, are not reconcilable now with the capital requirements of a new nuclear power project". That left Nuclearelectrica with large majority share in the project, prompting a search for other investors. In November 2013, China General Nuclear Power Corp. (CGN) signed an agreement to invest in the project at an undisclosed level. Shortly thereafter, AcelorMittal and Enel announced plans to sell their stakes.

In 2016 the Romanian government gave support for the creation of a joint venture led by China General Nuclear (CGN) to progress the project. In November 2015 Nuclearelectrica and CGN signed a memorandum of understanding regarding the construction, operation and decommissioning of Cernavoda 3 and 4. However, in January 2020 the  government under Ludovic Orban decided to abandon the proposal.

In October 2020, new plans were launched with cooperation from the US, Canada and France.  The two reactors are expected to become functional in 2030 and 2031, respectively.

Unit 5 
There are currently no plans to complete Unit 5 at this time. However, the possibility of finishing construction remains.

Incidents
 In the summer of 2003, the sole operating reactor at the time had to be closed, because of the lack of cooling water. It was brought back online after roughly 2–3 months.
 On 8 Apr 2009, the second reactor of the Romania's Cernavodă NPP was shut down due to a malfunction which led to electrical outages.
 On 30 May 2009, Unit 1 of the Romania's Cernavodă NPP was shut down following a water pipe crack. The Cernavodă NPP's second unit was undergoing an overhaul, so it was not producing any electricity.
 On 16 January 2010, the first unit was shut down due to steam leakage.

See also

 Energy in Romania
 Nuclear power in Romania
 Atucha Nuclear Power Plant - another heavy water reactor whose construction was completed after decades of interruption

References

External links
Official site  
CBC clip discussing the construction of the plant

Nuclear power stations in Romania
Buildings and structures in Constanța County
Nuclear power stations with proposed reactors
Nuclear power stations using CANDU reactors